The 2003–04 Calgary Flames season was the 24th National Hockey League season in Calgary, and the 32nd for the franchise in the NHL. The Flames ended a seven-year playoff drought, qualifying for the post-season for the first time since 1996. The Flames defeated three division winners en route to an appearance in the 2004 Stanley Cup Finals. The Flames were defeated in the finals by the Tampa Bay Lightning in seven games. The run to the finals captured the imagination of the city, while the Red Mile celebrations gained international attention for the "Mardi Gras-like" atmosphere as up to 80,000 people celebrated in the streets after each playoff game.

Head coach Darryl Sutter succeeded Craig Button as the Flames' general manager. Sutter made numerous changes to the roster as he worked to remake the Flames into a fast, physical club.  Chris Drury was dealt to Buffalo for Rhett Warrener and Steve Reinprecht before the season began. A knee injury to starting goaltender Roman Turek led Sutter to trade for Miikka Kiprusoff, a player he knew from his days with the San Jose Sharks. Kiprusoff responded to the deal by posting an NHL record low goals against average of 1.69.

The Flames were led offensively by Jarome Iginla, who tied Ilya Kovalchuk and Rick Nash for the league lead with 41 goals as the trio shared the Rocket Richard Trophy. Iginla represented the Flames at the 54th National Hockey League All-Star Game in Minnesota, and was named a second team all-star for his performance during the season. Iginla's charity work and leadership both on and off the ice led to his also being awarded the King Clancy Memorial Trophy and NHL Foundation Player Award.

Regular season
After struggling with an injury to starting goaltender Roman Turek in the first game of the season, an early November trade for San Jose Sharks third stringer Miikka Kiprusoff sparked the Flames, as Kiprusoff led Calgary into the playoffs for the first time in eight years.

Defenceman Mike Commodore became a cult hero for his unruly red mop of hair during the playoffs, leading many fans to wear red afro wigs to playoff games.  Craig Conroy brought a team building idea from his days with the St. Louis Blues, having the team award a green hard hat to the hardest working player each time the Flames won. As the exercise gained popularity, fans also began wearing green hard hats to the arena themselves.

The Flames allowed the fewest short-handed goals during the regular season, with just 2.

Season standings

Playoffs

Calgary's defeat of the Vancouver Canucks in the first round was the first playoff series victory for the Flames since they won the Cup in 1989. Jarome Iginla scored two goals and assisted on Martin Gelinas' overtime winner in game seven, sending fans in Calgary into the streets to celebrate the victory. The Flames pulled off an even bigger upset in round two, knocking off the Presidents' Trophy winning Red Wings in six, including back-to-back 1–0 shutouts in the final two games. Once again, Gelinas scored the overtime winner on a rebound on a play set up by Iginla. In doing so, Gelinas became the first player in NHL history to record three career OT winners to end a series.

The third round series pitted the Flames against head coach Darryl Sutter and goaltender Miikka Kiprusoff's old team – the San Jose Sharks. After jumping out to a 2–0 series lead on the road, the Sharks returned the favour, defeating Calgary twice at home. After blanking the Sharks in San Jose in game five, the Flames returned home with a chance to go to the Stanley Cup Final. Led once again by Iginla and Gelinas, the Flames cruised to a 3–1 victory. In addition, the Flames became the first team to defeat the 1st, 2nd and 3rd seeded teams in their conference en route to the Stanley Cup Final (which was only repeated in 2012 by the Los Angeles Kings).

The Final versus Tampa Bay became known for controversy. First, referee Kerry Fraser was pulled from his game six assignment in Calgary after drawing the ire of Flames fans following several calls in game four that upset the local fans. Fraser would instead officiate game seven in Tampa.  The officiating in game four prompted a rant by Sutter, in which he alleged that the NHL did not want Calgary to win.

Late in game six, with the score tied, a shot that deflected off of Gelinas' skate was stopped by Tampa Bay goaltender Nikolai Khabibulin on the goal line. Later replays indicated that the puck may have crossed the line, however the play was not reviewed at the time, and the NHL would later rule the video was inconclusive, since the puck was in the air, not on the ice. Instead, the Lightning would win in double overtime, and go on to win game seven by a 2–1 score.

Despite the game seven loss, the playoff run lifted the city to a new high. Over 30,000 fans celebrated the Flames run at a rally at Olympic Plaza shortly after the Final had ended.

Schedule and results

Regular season

|-  style="text-align:center; background:#fbb;"
| 1 || October 9 || Calgary || 1–4 || Vancouver || || Turek || 18,630 || 0–1–0–0 || 0 || 
|-  style="text-align:center; background:#bfb;"
| 2 || October 11 || San Jose || 2–3 || Calgary || || McLennan || 17,039 || 1–1–0–0 || 2 || 
|-  style="text-align:center; background:#bfb;"
| 3 || October 14 || Edmonton || 0–1 || Calgary || || McLennan || 16,009 || 2–1–0–0|| 4 || 
|-  style="text-align:center; background:#fbb;"
| 4 || October 18 || Buffalo || 2–0 || Calgary || || Turek || 14,139 || 2–2–0–0 || 4 || 
|-  style="text-align:center; background:#bfb;"
| 5 || October 21 || Calgary || 3–2 || Minnesota || || McLennan || 18,064 || 3–2–0–0 || 6 || 
|-  style="text-align:center; background:#fbb;"
| 6 || October 24 || St. Louis || 2–1 || Calgary || || McLennan || 15,454 || 3–3–0–0 || 6 || 
|-  style="text-align:center; background:#bfb;"
| 7 || October 25 || Calgary || 4–2 || Edmonton || || McLennan || 16,839 || 4–3–0–0 || 8 || 
|-  style="text-align:center; background:#fbb;"
| 8 || October 28 || Calgary || 2–4 || Colorado || || McLennan || 18,007 || 4–4–0–0 || 8 || 
|-  style="text-align:center; background:#fdd;"
| 9 || October 29 || Calgary || 3–4 || Dallas || OT || Sabourin || 18,209 || 4–4–0–1 || 9 || 
|-

|-  style="text-align:center; background:#bfb;"
| 10 || November 1 || Columbus || 0–3 || Calgary || || McLennan || 14,539 || 5–4–0–1 || 11 || 
|-  style="text-align:center; background:#fbb;"
| 11 || November 4 || Detroit || 3–0 || Calgary || || McLennan || 15,259 || 5–5–0–1 || 11 || 
|-  style="text-align:center; background:#fbb;"
| 12 || November 7 || Minnesota || 3–0 || Calgary || || McLennan || 13,839 || 5–6–0–1 || 11 || 
|-  style="text-align:center; background:#fbb;"
| 13 || November 9 || Calgary || 3–4 || Columbus || || Sabourin || 17,957 || 5–7–0–1 || 11 || 
|-  style="text-align:center; background:#bfb;"
| 14 || November 12 || Calgary || 6–2 || Chicago || || McLennan || 11,988 || 6–7–0–1 || 13 || 
|-  style="text-align:center; background:#fbb;"
| 15 || November 13 || Calgary || 1–4 || Nashville || || Sabourin || 9,630 || 6–8–0–1 || 13 || 
|-  style="text-align:center; background:#fdd;"
| 16 || November 15 || Calgary || 1–2 || Edmonton || OT || McLennan || 16,839 || 6–8–0–2 || 14 || 
|-  style="text-align:center; background:#bfb;"
| 17 || November 18 || Toronto || 2–3 || Calgary || OT || McLennan || 17,509 || 7–8–0–2 || 16 || 
|-  style="text-align:center; background:#bfb;"
| 18 || November 20 || Montreal || 1–2 || Calgary || || Kiprusoff || 16,139 || 8–8–0–2 || 18 || 
|-  style="text-align:center; background:#bfb;"
| 19 || November 22 || Chicago || 1–2 || Calgary || || Kiprusoff || 15,549 || 9–8–0–2 || 20 || 
|-  style="text-align:center; background:#fdd;"
| 20 || November 27 || Colorado || 6–5 || Calgary || OT || Kiprusoff || ?? || 9–8–0–3 ||21 || 
|-  style="text-align:center; background:#ffb;"
| 21 || November 29 || Vancouver || 4–4 || Calgary || OT || McLennan || 18,159 || 9–8–1–3 || 22 || 
|-

|-  style="text-align:center; background:#bfb;"
| 22 || December 2 || San Jose || 1–3 || Calgary || || Kiprusoff || 13,059 || 10–8–1–3 || 24 || 
|-  style="text-align:center; background:#bfb;"
| 23 || December 4 || Calgary || 4–1 || Vancouver || || Kiprusoff || 18,630 || 11–8–1–3 || 26 || 
|-  style="text-align:center; background:#bfb;"
| 24 || December 5 || Minnesota || 1–2 || Calgary || || Kiprusoff || 14,669 || 12–8–1–3 || 28 || 
|-  style="text-align:center; background:#bfb;"
| 25 || December 7 || Pittsburgh || 1–6 || Calgary || || Kiprusoff || 15,009 || 13–8–1–3 || 30 || 
|-  style="text-align:center; background:#fbb;"
| 26 || December 9 || Calgary || 1–2 || Minnesota || || Kiprusoff || 18,568  || 13–9–1–3 || 30 || 
|-  style="text-align:center; background:#bfb;"
| 27 || December 11 || Carolina || 0–1 || Calgary || || Kiprusoff || 14,119 || 14–9–1–3 || 32 || 
|-  style="text-align:center; background:#ffb;"
| 28 || December 13 || Colorado || 1–1 || Calgary || OT || Kiprusoff || 16,809 || 14–9–2–3 || 33 || 
|-  style="text-align:center; background:#bfb;"
| 29 || December 16 || Calgary || 3–2 || Philadelphia || OT || Kiprusoff || 18,931 || 15–9–2–3 || 35 || 
|-  style="text-align:center; background:#bfb;"
| 30 || December 18 || Calgary || 5–0 || Boston || || McLennan || 10,659 || 16–9–2–3 || 37 || 
|-  style="text-align:center; background:#bfb;"
| 31 || December 19 || Calgary || 2–1 || Columbus || || Kiprusoff || 16,561 || 17–9–2–3 || 39 || 
|-  style="text-align:center; background:#bfb;"
| 32 || December 23 || Edmonton || 1–2 || Calgary || || Kiprusoff || 18,389 || 18–9–2–3 || 41 || 
|-  style="text-align:center; background:#fbb;"
| 33 || December 26 || Vancouver || 2–0 || Calgary || || Kiprusoff || 18,419 || 18–10–2–3 || 41 || 
|-  style="text-align:center; background:#bfb;"
| 34 || December 28 || Calgary || 2–1 || Edmonton || || Kiprusoff || 16,839 || 19–10–2–3 || 43 || 
|-  style="text-align:center; background:#ffb;"
| 35 || December 29 || Minnesota || 2–2 || Calgary || OT || Kiprusoff || 16,279 || 19–10–3–3 || 44 || 
|-  style="text-align:center; background:#fbb;"
| 36 || December 31 || Colorado || 2–1 || Calgary || || McLennan || 18,469 || 19–11–3–3 || 44 || 
|-

|-  style="text-align:center; background:#fbb;"
| 37 || January 3 || Vancouver || 3–1 || Calgary || || McLennan || 18,269 || 19–12–3–3 || 44 || 
|-  style="text-align:center; background:#bfb;"
| 38 || January 5 || Calgary || 5–0 || NY Rangers || || McLennan || 18,200 || 20–12–3–3 || 46 || 
|-  style="text-align:center; background:#bfb;"
| 39 || January 6 || Calgary || 3–2 || NY Islanders || || McLennan || 12,576 || 21–12–3–3 || 48 || 
|-  style="text-align:center; background:#fbb;"
| 40 || January 8 || Calgary || 1–3 || Chicago || || McLennan || 10,865 || 21–13–3–3 || 48 || 
|-  style="text-align:center; background:#bfb;"
| 41 || January 10 || Florida ||  2–4 || Calgary || || McLennan || 16,809 || 22–13–3–3 || 50 || 
|-  style="text-align:center; background:#fbb;"
| 42 || January 13 || Calgary || 1–4 || Toronto || || McLennan || 19,310 || 22–14–3–2 || 50 || 
|-  style="text-align:center; background:#ffb;"
| 43 || January 14 || Calgary || 3–3 || Washington || OT || McLennan || 14,537 || 22–14–4–3 || 51 || 
|-  style="text-align:center; background:#fbb;"
| 44 || January 17 || Dallas || 3–2 || Calgary || || Turek || 17,909 || 22–15–4–3 || 51 || 
|-  style="text-align:center; background:#bfb;"
| 45 || January 19 || Calgary || 5–1 || Anaheim || || Turek || 13,146 || 23–15–4–3 || 53 || 
|-  style="text-align:center; background:#fbb;"
| 46 || January 20 || Calgary || 1–4 || Los Angeles || || Turek || 18,118 || 23–16–4–3 || 53 || 
|-  style="text-align:center; background:#bfb;"
| 47 || January 22 || Nashville || 0–4 || Calgary || || Turek || 16,629 || 24–16–4–3 || 55 || 
|-  style="text-align:center; background:#fbb;"
| 48 || January 24 || Tampa Bay || 6–2 || Calgary || || Turek || 17,109 || 24–17–4–3 || 55 || 
|-  style="text-align:center; background:#bfb;"
| 49 || January 27 || Calgary || 2–1 || Phoenix || || Turek || ?? || 25–17–4–3 || 57 || 
|-  style="text-align:center; background:#fbb;"
| 50 || January 28 || Calgary || 1–4 || San Jose || || Turek || 15,119 || 25–18–4–3 || 57 || 
|-  style="text-align:center; background:#fbb;"
| 51 || January 30 || Chicago || 5–3 || Calgary || || Turek || 17,139 || 25–19–4–3 || 57 || 
|-

|-  style="text-align:center; background:#bfb;"
| 52 || February 1 || Anaheim || 4–6 || Calgary || || McLennan || 15,189 || 26–19–4–3 || 59 || 
|-  style="text-align:center; background:#ffb;"
| 53 || February 3 || Los Angeles || 4–4 || Calgary || OT || McLennan || 14,169 || 26–19–5–3 || 60 || 
|-  style="text-align:center; background:#fbb;"
| 54 || February 5 || St. Louis || 2–1 || Calgary || || Turek || 15,389 || 26–20–5–3 || 60 || 
|-  style="text-align:center; background:#bfb;"
| 55 || February 10 || Atlanta || 2–5 || Calgary || || Kiprusoff || 16,549 || 27–20–5–3 || 62 || 
|-  style="text-align:center; background:#bfb;"
| 56 || February 11 || Calgary || 3–2 || Vancouver || || Turek || 18,630 || 28–20–5–3 || 64 || 
|-  style="text-align:center; background:#bfb;"
| 57 || February 13 || Anaheim || 1–2 || Calgary || || Kiprusoff || 17,749 || 29–20–5–3 || 66 || 
|-  style="text-align:center; background:#bfb;"
| 58 || February 15 || Calgary || 2–1 || Minnesota || || Kiprusoff || 18,568 || 30–20–5–3 || 68 || 
|-  style="text-align:center; background:#fbb;"
| 59 || February 19 || Calgary || 1–4 || Montreal || || Kiprusoff || 21,273 || 30–21–5–3 || 68 || 
|-  style="text-align:center; background:#fbb;"
| 60 || February 21 || Calgary || 1–2 || Ottawa || || Turek || 18,500 || 30–22–5–3 || 68 || 
|-  style="text-align:center; background:#fbb;"
| 61 || February 22 || Calgary || 1–3 || New Jersey || || Kiprusoff || 17,733 || 30–23–5–3 || 68 || 
|-  style="text-align:center; background:#bfb;"
| 62 || February 24 || Calgary || 2–0 || Colorado || || Kiprusoff || 18,007 || 31–23–5–3 || 70 || 
|-  style="text-align:center; background:#fbb;"
| 63 || February 26 || Detroit || 2–1 || Calgary || || Kiprusoff || 18,862 || 31–24–5–3 || 70 || 
|-  style="text-align:center; background:#bfb;"
| 64 || February 29 || Phoenix || 2–4 || Calgary || || Kiprusoff || 17,579 || 32–24–5–3 || 72 || 
|-

|-  style="text-align:center; background:#bfb;"
| 65 || March 2 || Calgary || 4–2 || St. Louis || || Kiprusoff || 15,571 || 33–24–5–3 || 74 || 
|-  style="text-align:center; background:#fbb;"
| 66 || March 3 || Calgary || 1–2 || Detroit || || Turek || 20,066 || 33–25–5–3 || 74 || 
|-  style="text-align:center; background:#fbb;"
| 67 || March 5 || Calgary || 1–5 || Dallas || || Kiprusoff || 18,532 || 33–26–5–3 || 74 || 
|-  style="text-align:center; background:#bfb;"
| 68 || March 7 || Calgary || 7–1 || Colorado || || Kiprusoff || 18,007 || 34–26–5–3 || 76 || 
|-  style="text-align:center; background:#ffb;"
| 69 || March 9 || Edmonton || 1–1 || Calgary || OT || Kiprusoff || 18,479 || 34–26–6–3 || 77 || 
|-  style="text-align:center; background:#bfb;"
| 70 || March 11 || Ottawa || 2–4 || Calgary || || Kiprusoff || 17,869 || 35–26–6–3 || 79 || 
|-  style="text-align:center; background:#ffb;"
| 71 || March 13 || Calgary || 4–4 || Nashville || OT || Kiprusoff || 17,113 || 35–26–7–3 || 80 || 
|-  style="text-align:center; background:#bfb;"
| 72 || March 14 || Calgary || 3–0 || St. Louis || || Turek || 19,523 || 36–26–7–3 || 82 || 
|-  style="text-align:center; background:#bfb;"
| 73 || March 16 || Calgary || 4–1 || Detroit || || Kiprusoff || 20,066 || 37–26–7–3 || 84 || 
|-  style="text-align:center; background:#bfb;"
| 74 || March 18 || Columbus || 0–2 || Calgary || || Kiprusoff || 17,479 || 38–26–7–3 || 86 || 
|-  style="text-align:center; background:#fbb;"
| 75 || March 20 || Nashville || 3–1 || Calgary || || Kiprusoff || 18,439 || 38–27–7–3 || 86 || 
|-  style="text-align:center; background:#fbb;"
| 76 || March 22 || Dallas || 4–0 || Calgary || || Kiprusoff || 17,729 || 38–28–7–3 || 86 || 
|-  style="text-align:center; background:#bfb;"
| 77 || March 24 || Calgary || 4–0 || Phoenix || || Turek || 18,496 || 39–28–7–3 || 88 || 
|-  style="text-align:center; background:#fbb;"
| 78 || March 25 || Calgary || 2–3 || San Jose || || Kiprusoff || 15,588 || 39–29–7–3 || 88 || 
|-  style="text-align:center; background:#bfb;"
| 79 || March 27 || Los Angeles || 2–3 || Calgary || OT || Kiprusoff || 18,419 || 40–29–7–3 || 90 || 
|-  style="text-align:center; background:#bfb;"
| 80 || March 31 || Phoenix || 0–1 || Calgary || || Kiprusoff || 18,419 || 41–29–7–3 || 92 || 
|-

|-  style="text-align:center; background:#bfb;"
| 81 || April 2 || Calgary || 3–2 || Los Angeles || || Kiprusoff || 18,247 || 42–29–7–3 || 94 || 
|-  style="text-align:center; background:#fbb;"
| 82 || April 4 || Calgary || 1–2 || Anaheim || || Turek || 17,174 || 42–30–7–3 || 94 || 
|-

|-
| Legend:

Playoffs

|-  style="text-align:center; background:#fbb;"
| 1 || April 7 || Calgary || 3–5 || Vancouver || || Kiprusoff || 18,630 || Vancouver leads 1–0 || 
|-  style="text-align:center; background:#bfb;"
| 2 || April 9 || Calgary || 2–1 || Vancouver || || Kiprusoff || 18,630 || Series tied 1–1 || 
|-  style="text-align:center; background:#fbb;"
| 3 || April 11 || Vancouver || 2–1 || Calgary || || Kiprusoff || 19,289 || Vancouver leads 2–1 || 
|-  style="text-align:center; background:#bfb;"
| 4 || April 13 || Vancouver || 0–4 || Calgary || || Kiprusoff || 19,289 || Series tied 2–2 || 
|-  style="text-align:center; background:#bfb;"
| 5 || April 15 || Calgary || 2–1 || Vancouver || || Kiprusoff || 18,630 || Calgary leads 3–2 || 
|-  style="text-align:center; background:#fbb;"
| 6 || April 17 || Vancouver || 5–4 || Calgary || 3OT || Kiprusoff || 19,289 || Series tied 3–3 || 
|-  style="text-align:center; background:#bfb;"
| 7 || April 19 || Calgary || 3–2 || Vancouver || OT || Kiprusoff || 18,630 || Calgary wins 4–3 || 
|-

|-  style="text-align:center; background:#bfb;"
| 1 || April 22 || Calgary || 2–1 || Detroit || OT || Kiprusoff || 20,066 || Calgary leads 1–0 || 
|-  style="text-align:center; background:#fbb;"
| 2 || April 24 || Calgary || 2–5 || Detroit || || Kiprusoff || 20,066 || Series tied 1–1 || 
|-  style="text-align:center; background:#bfb;"
| 3 || April 27 || Detroit || 2–3 || Calgary || || Kiprusoff || 19,289 || Calgary leads 2–1 || 
|-  style="text-align:center; background:#fbb;"
| 4 || April 29 || Detroit || 4–2 || Calgary || || Kiprusoff || 19,289 || Series tied 2–2 || 
|-  style="text-align:center; background:#bfb;"
| 5 || May 1 || Calgary || 1–0 || Detroit || || Kiprusoff || 20,066|| Calgary leads 3–2 || 
|-  style="text-align:center; background:#bfb;"
| 6 || May 3 || Detroit || 0–1 || Calgary || OT || Kiprusoff || 19,289 || Calgary wins 4–2 || 
|-

|-  style="text-align:center; background:#bfb;"
| 1 || May 9 || Calgary || 4–3 || San Jose || OT || Kiprusoff || 17,496 || Calgary leads 1–0 || 
|-  style="text-align:center; background:#bfb;"
| 2 || May 11 || Calgary || 4–1 || San Jose || || Kiprusoff || 17,496 || Calgary leads 2–0 || 
|-  style="text-align:center; background:#fbb;"
| 3 || May 13 || San Jose || 3–0 || Calgary || || Kiprusoff || 19,289 || Calgary leads 2–1 || 
|-  style="text-align:center; background:#fbb;"
| 4 || May 16 || San Jose || 4–2 || Calgary || || Kiprusoff || 19,289 || Series tied 2–2 || 
|-  style="text-align:center; background:#bfb;"
| 5 || May 17 || Calgary || 3–0 || San Jose || || Kiprusoff || 17,496 || Calgary leads 3–2 || 
|-  style="text-align:center; background:#bfb;"
| 6 || May 19 || San Jose || 1–3 || Calgary || || Kiprusoff || 19,289 || Calgary wins 4–2 || 
|-

|-  style="text-align:center; background:#bfb;"
| 1 || May 25 || Calgary || 4–1 || Tampa Bay || || Kiprusoff || 21,674 || Calgary leads 1–0 || 
|-  style="text-align:center; background:#fbb;"
| 2 || May 27 || Calgary || 1–4 || Tampa Bay || || Kiprusoff || 22,222 || Series tied 1–1 || 
|-  style="text-align:center; background:#bfb;"
| 3 || May 29 || Tampa Bay || 0–3 || Calgary || || Kiprusoff || 19,221 || Calgary leads 2–1 || 
|-  style="text-align:center; background:#fbb;"
| 4 || May 31 || Tampa Bay || 1–0 || Calgary || || Kiprusoff || 19,221 || Series tied 2–2 || 
|-  style="text-align:center; background:#bfb;"
| 5 || June 3 || Calgary || 3–2 || Tampa Bay || OT || Kiprusoff || 22,426 || Calgary leads 3–2 || 
|-  style="text-align:center; background:#fbb;"
| 6 || June 5 || Tampa Bay || 3–2 || Calgary || 2OT || Kiprusoff || 19,221 || Series tied 3–3 || 
|-  style="text-align:center; background:#fbb;"
| 7 || June 7 || Calgary || 1–2 || Tampa Bay || || Kiprusoff || 22,717 || Tampa Bay wins 4–3 || 
|-

|-
| Legend:

Player statistics
Jarome Iginla's 41 goals placed him in a tie for the league lead, earning him his second Rocket Richard Trophy. Iginla shared the award with Atlanta's Ilya Kovalchuk and Columbus' Rick Nash, both of whom also scored 41 goals.  Iginla also led the league in playoff goals, as his total of 13 was one better than Tampa's Brad Richards and Ruslan Fedotenko.  Iginla led the team in scoring for the fourth consecutive season,

Miikka Kiprusoff, acquired from the San Jose Sharks early in the season, set a modern NHL record low goals against average of 1.69 in 39 games played. He recorded five shutouts in the playoffs, a franchise record. Kiprusoff's performance with the Flames led to his being named the starting goaltender for team Finland at the 2004 World Cup of Hockey, where he led the Finns to the championship final.

Scoring
 Position abbreviations: C = Centre; D = Defence; G = Goaltender; LW = Left Wing; RW = Right Wing
  = Joined team via a transaction (e.g., trade, waivers, signing) during the season. Stats reflect time with the Flames only.
  = Left team via a transaction (e.g., trade, waivers, release) during the season. Stats reflect time with the Flames only.
 Bold text denotes league leader.

Goaltending
  = Joined team via a transaction (e.g., trade, waivers, signing) during the season. Stats reflect time with the Flames only.
  = Left team via a transaction (e.g., trade, waivers, release) during the season. Stats reflect time with the Flames only.
Bold text denotes league record. Italics denotes franchise record.

Awards and records

Awards

Milestones

Transactions

Prior to the season, the Flames sent restricted free agent Chris Drury to the Buffalo Sabres for defenceman Rhett Warrener and forward Steve Reinprecht, whom the Sabres had acquired from the Colorado Avalanche, then included in the Drury trade.  Warrener especially was seen as being a key player for the Flames as they attempted to qualify for the playoffs.

The acquisition of Miikka Kiprusoff proved to be a significant turning point for the Flames' season.  Darryl Sutter dealt for Kiprusoff after starting goaltender Roman Turek suffered a knee injury that left him unable to play for several months.  Kiprusoff stabilized the Flames' goaltending situation, producing a league record low goals against average.

Trades

Players acquired

Players lost

Signings

Draft picks

The 2003 NHL Entry Draft was held in Nashville, Tennessee on June 21–22, 2003. The Flames selected nine players in the draft.  Calgary selected offensive minded defenceman Dion Phaneuf with their first pick, ninth overall. Phaneuf's coach with the Red Deer Rebels described him as being a physical player on draft day. "This kid doesn't hit to hit. He hits to hurt. It's a mind-set that's rare in the game. At any level. You can't teach it, you can't fake it. You're either born with it, or you're not."  Phaneuf quickly made an impact in the NHL, scoring 20 goals as a rookie in 2005–06, earning a nomination for the Calder Memorial Trophy as top rookie.  Phaneuf was nominated for the Norris Trophy as top defenceman in 2007–08, just his third year in the NHL.

Farm teams

Lowell Lockmonsters
After shutting down the Saint John Flames, the Flames entered into an agreement to share an affiliation with the Lowell Lockmonsters with the Carolina Hurricanes. The Lockmonsters posted a 32–36–6–6 record, out of the playoffs with a 6th-place finish in the Atlantic Division.

Las Vegas Wranglers
The Las Vegas Wranglers entered the ECHL as an expansion team, immediately entering an affiliation agreement with the Flames. The team was immediately competitive, finishing second in the Pacific Division with a 43–22–7 record. This did not translate into the playoffs however, as the Wranglers lost in the divisional semifinals.

See also
 2003–04 NHL season

Notes

References

 Player stats: 2006–07 Calgary Flames Media Guide – 2003–04 stats, pg. 108.
 
 

Calgary Flames seasons
Calgary Flames Season, 2003-04
Western Conference (NHL) championship seasons
Cal
Cal